is a Japanese football player who plays as a defender for Belgian club Kortrijk.

Club career
Watanabe joined J1 League club FC Tokyo in 2018.

On 28 December 2021, Watanabe signed a 3.5-year contract with Kortrijk in Belgium.

Career statistics
Last update: 4 January 2022

Reserves performance

Last Updated: 4 January 2022

National team statistics

References

External links

1997 births
Association football people from Saitama Prefecture
Living people
Japanese footballers
Japan international footballers
Association football defenders
Chuo University alumni
FC Tokyo players
FC Tokyo U-23 players
K.V. Kortrijk players
J1 League players
J3 League players
Belgian Pro League players
Japanese expatriate footballers
Expatriate footballers in Belgium
Japanese expatriate sportspeople in Belgium